Oscar W. Neale was a member of the Wisconsin State Senate.

Biography
Neale was born Oscar Winfred Neale on December 17, 1873 in Birmingham, Erie County, Ohio. He would become a teacher and a school principal. He went to Denison University in Ohio and to Midland College in Nebraska. Neale lived in Stevens Point, Wisconsin and was the director of rural education at Stevens Point Teachers College and served on the common council. Neale also served as director of rural education at the state teachers college in Kearney, Nebraska. He died on April 9, 1957.

Neale has a residence hall named in his honor at the University of Wisconsin-Stevens Point.

Political career
Neale was elected to the Senate in 1946 and was re-elected in 1950. Previously, he was a superintendent of schools. He was a Republican.

References

People from Erie County, Ohio
People from Stevens Point, Wisconsin
Wisconsin city council members
Republican Party Wisconsin state senators
Educators from Wisconsin
1873 births
1957 deaths
Educators from Ohio